Buff Bay is a settlement in Portland, Jamaica.

References

Populated places in Portland Parish